Wilbur Hamilton Haines (January 23, 1883 - March 1966) was an American college football player and coach. He served as the head football coach at Haverford College in 1908.

References

1883 births
1966 deaths
Haverford Fords football coaches
Haverford Fords football players
People from Haddonfield, New Jersey
Sportspeople from Camden County, New Jersey